This is the filmography of Indian film actor Sampath Kumar (1950 – 2009), known as Vishnuvardhan.

Kannada

Other languages

Hindi 
 Ek Naya Itihas (1984)
 Inspector Dhanush (1991) (Kannada version - Police Mathu Dada)
 Ashaant (1993) (Kannada version - Vishnu Vijaya)
 Zaalim (1994) ...Inspector Mohan

Malayalam 
 Adima Changala (1981)
 Kauravar (1992) .... Haridas IPS

Tamil 
 Alaigal (1973)
 Mazhalai Pattalam (1980)
 Eetti (1985)
 Sri Raghavendra (1985)
 Viduthalai (1986)
Paruva Raagam (1987)

Telugu 
 Okkadu Chaalu (1996)
 Sardar Dharmanna (1987)
 Lakshmi Nirdoshi  (1984)

References

Notes

Indian filmographies
Male actor filmographies